The Norisring is a street circuit in Nuremberg, Bavaria, Germany. Originally established as a motorcycle racing venue in 1947 and named in a 1950 competition to win a light motorcycle, the track became known as a sports car racing venue in the 1970s. Since 2000, it has been annually used by the Deutsche Tourenwagen Masters, the premier Germany-based touring car racing series. The length of the simple track with two hairpin turns and a chicane has been set to  since 1972, after various lengths were used in its early years.

History

In 1950, the name Norisring was chosen for the venue in a competition to win a light motorcycle. Motorcycle racing events remained central to the circuit until 1957, as six motorcycle manufacturers were based in Nuremberg at the time, but a crisis in the industry led to no racing events taking place in 1958 and 1959.

Although automobile racing events were held at the circuit as early as 1948 and on its revival in 1960, they would only become the venue's primary focus after the Norisring Trophy was introduced in 1967. During the 1970s and 1980s, sports prototype racing was popular at the Norisring and motorcycle racing events were abandoned after 1976. The World Sportscar Championship events that took place in 1986 and 1987 each attracted more than 100,000 spectators to the circuit. After the 1980s, the venue switched its primary focus to touring car racing. In 2000, the premier Germany-based touring car series was revived under the Deutsche Tourenwagen Masters moniker and the annual Norisringrennen became the circuit's most important event.

The Norisringrennen traditionally takes place halfway through the Deutsche Tourenwagen Masters season in late June or early July. The race, which regularly attracts between 100,000 and 140,000 spectators to the circuit, is considered a highlight of the touring car series, as fans get closer to the action and the drivers than on modern venues. Since 2015, there has been one race on Saturday and one race on Sunday.

After the beginning of the 2020 season was postponed due to the COVID-19 pandemic, the Norisringrennen was planned to take place in mid-July as the season opener, but it was eventually cancelled in accordance with the restrictions on public events in Nuremberg. As the 2021 season began in late June, it was known that the Norisringrennen would not take place during the summer, but by the end of July the circuit was confirmed as the venue for the season finale in October for the first time in its history. In 2022, the Norisringrennen returned to its traditional spot in the race calendar, and a round of the TCR Europe Touring Car Series was run in support of the main event for the first time.

Due to its proximity to the Dutzendteich lake and its location inside a large city, the Norisring has been compared to the Circuit de Monaco.

Layout

Different configurations were used in the early years of the circuit, including figure-8 layouts. The start-finish straight in front of the central grandstand, the Steintribüne, leads to a right-hand sweeper, followed by a left-hand U-turn that is located near the Grundig tower and called the Grundigkehre. After the U-turn, the track heads back to the Steintribüne via a left-hand sweeper, with the Schöller-S right-left chicane placed between the sweeper and the back straight. This is the place where cars often touch the outside wall. After a right-hand kink, a left-hand U-turn called the Dutzendteichkehre leads back to the main straight via a flat-out left-hand kink.

The Norisring is laid out on streets that are otherwise used for public traffic. The construction of the circuit begins two weeks before the race weekend. It includes installing  of crash barriers,  of catch fencing and several temporary stands. After the race weekend, the equipment is removed from the area within a week.

Fatalities

Mexican racing driver Pedro Rodríguez died at the Norisring in 1971 when the Ferrari 512 he was hired to drive (in championship events, he used to race a Gulf Racing-Porsche 917) hit the bridge wall before the Schöller-S and burst into flames. Afterwards, the track was shortened by moving the Grundigkehre U-turn closer in order to reduce corner speeds. In 2006, a memorial plaque was inaugurated at the site of the crash.

In 1988, Hungarian racing driver Csaba Kesjár died after crashing into the barriers at the Dutzendteichkehre during a practice session in the German Formula Three Championship.

Lap records

See also
 Norisring Nürnberg 200 Speedweekend

References

External links

 
 History
 Slalom
 Steintribüne meetings
 Classic Motorcycle events
 Circuit map and history at RacingCircuits.info
 How the DTM in Nuremberg feels like [german]

Buildings and structures in Nuremberg
Motorsport venues in Bavaria
Sports venues in Bavaria